Gulf Petrochemical Industries Company (GPIC)  is the only petrochemical producing company headquartered in the Kingdom of Bahrain and sells its products both locally and exports to other gulf countries and beyond, including U.S., China, India, Pakistan among others.

GPIC is jointly owned by three major governmental institutions, namely, the National Oil and Gas Holding Company (NOGA Holding) from the Kingdom of Bahrain, SABIC Agri-nutrient Investments from the Kingdom of Saudi Arabia, and Petrochemical Industries Co. (PIC) from the State of Kuwait.

Established with a paid-up capital of $160 million, the Company employs 444 people of whom 92% are Bahrainis.

Its operations that involve natural gas purchases, employment and training of Bahraini nationals, utilization of local contractors, power consumption and other financial and commercial operations inject around $270 million annually into the national economy. GPIC uses natural gas which is available locally, as a basis for the production of ammonia, urea and methanol, which are its sole products.

Production 
 Ammonia
 Methanol
 Urea

Corporate management
The company’s Board of Directors  comprises representatives from the three shareholding states and is chaired by H.E. Eng. Kamal Bin Ahmed Mohammed The company’s executive management is led by Yasser A.Rahim Alabbasi as President.

References

Petrochemical companies
Oil and gas companies of Bahrain
1979 establishments in Bahrain